The John McEwen House, or National Party Headquarters, is the head-office, or headquarters, of the Federal National Party. It was officially opened by Prime Minister John Gorton on 4 November 1968. Unlike the Liberal Party Headquarters, the National Party HQ was built in honour of former Prime Minister and National Party Leader John McEwen whom was Deputy Prime Minister (alive) at the time. Whereas the Liberal Party HQ was renamed in honour of Robert Menzies posthumously. The total cost of the building was A$262,000, over $200k of which being donated for the project. As well as being the head-office for the National Party it also serves offices of other organisations, including the Argentine embassy, and the National Party think tank: the Page Research Centre.

References 
Citations

Headquarters of political parties
National Party of Australia